Paracelis, officially the Municipality of Paracelis  is a 2nd class municipality in the province of Mountain Province, Philippines. According to the 2020 census, it has a population of 31,168 people.

Paracelis' population distribution is 37 percent urban and 63 percent rural. Urban settlement is on the west side of the town, a basin of low-level hilly-to-flat lands surrounded by mountains.

Due to hilly terrain, Paracelis has numerous zigzag roads in most parts, including access roads that connect the municipality to other border towns. On both sides of its zigzag roads, travelers can view the vast cornfield plantations alongside.

History
Paracelis was first settled by the Ga'dang (Gaddang) ethnic group, who were migrants from Cagayan Valley mountain range. They are the ascendants of the present Ga'dang tribe living in the periphery of the mountains of Paracelis. Through the years, Paracelis has become the main entry point to the rest of Mountain Province.

Founding
The name Paracelis came into existence as early as the 1900s as part of the territorial barangays of Natonin within the District of Kalao. Paracelis used to be part of Natonin and it became a regular town named Paracales with the enactment of Republic Act 3488 on June 16, 1962. The town was renamed Paracelis on June 18, 1966 under Republic Act 4738. The first appointed mayor was Benito Rafael.

The first official site of the civil government was at Natta'longan, now currently within Barangay Bantay. The pre-World War II government was short-lived and administration lasted under three local managements from 1917 to 1921. There is a historical gap from this decade up to post-World War II.

In 1962, the government center at Natta'longan was transferred to Anangka within the Rafael compound. The site was again transferred to a lot in Marat donated by the Gawwan family. In 1991, the officials of the municipal government transferred the government center to its current site in Poblacion. The government used to occupy a 1-hectare lot that housed all the units.

Contemporary history
Today, Paracelis has become a melting pot of migrants from different areas, such as the Balangao, Majukayong, Kalinga, and Ifugao tribes including Ilokanos. This migration has been instrumental on the fast rising urbanization of Paracelis in the last two decades. The town's current administration is introducing urbanization plan for the municipality.

Geography
Paracelis is a border town of Mountain Province where it shares borders with Kalinga, Isabela and Ifugao provinces. In the north, its borders with the city of Tabuk and the town of Tanudan. In the south, it is bordered by Alfonso Lista. In the north-east, it shares a border with Quezon, in the east with Mallig and Roxas in Isabela. In the west, it borders with Natonin.

Barangays

Paracelis is politically subdivided into 9 barangays. These barangays are headed by elected officials: Barangay Captain, Barangay Council, whose members are called Barangay Councilors. All are elected every three years.

 Anonat
 Bacarri
 Bananao
 Bantay
 Butigue
 Bunot
 Buringal
 Palitod
 Poblacion

Climate

Demographics

Language
The town of Paracelis is home to three indigenous dialects, the Balangaw dialect and the Ga'dang dialect (completely different from the Gaddang language found in Nueva Vizcaya, Isabela, and Aurora), and the Majukayong. Ilocano is the lingua franca of the municipality.

Economy 

The municipality of Paracelis depends on agriculture as its main engine of growth with vast plantation of corn. The town also produces vegetables, oranges and timber. Trade activities include the commerce of basic consumer goods.

The municipal government is planning to pursue real estate development and tourism as its next engines of growth. The town is pursuing tourism since it possesses scenic terrains of hills and slopes ideal for nature lovers and hikers. Its vast low terrains is ideal for real estate development.

Potential economic activities of the town in manufacturing is canning and feed mill production due to availability of basic raw material from its vast cornfields. Its location at the crossroad makes Paracelis a future trading hub in the Eastern Cordillera Growth Corridor, a primary growth center of the Cordillera Administrative Region.

Government
Paracelis, belonging to the lone congressional district of the province of Mountain Province, is governed by a mayor designated as its local chief executive and by a municipal council as its legislative body in accordance with the Local Government Code. The mayor, vice mayor, and the councilors are elected directly by the people through an election which is being held every three years.

Elected officials

Members of the Municipal Council (2019–2022):
 Congressman: Maximo Y. Dalog Jr.
 Mayor: Marcos G. Ayangwa
 Vice-Mayor: Lister M. Carlos
 Councilors:
 Ruben T. Vicente
 Lito B. Basungit
 Marcelo T. Ambatali
 Victorino S. Bannaue
 John B. Banggolay
 Ateneo B. Gusimat
 Gaston G. Todco
 Marciano O. Lappao Jr.

Transportation
The only mode of transportation to and from Paracelis are buses and jeepneys plying to Santiago, Baguio, Tabuk, Alfonso Lista and Natonin. Going south, it takes approximately 1.5 hours to reach Alfonso Lista and 3 hours to Santiago from Paracelis. Going north, it takes approximately 2 hours to reach Tabuk . Going west to Natonin town proper, it takes less than an hour. Currently, there is no road access from the town proper going to Mallig in the east but there is road from its border Barangay Buringal to Mallig.

As of 2017, there is concreting of the national highway from Butigue, Palitud, Anonat going to Roxas, Isabela

Education
 Tertiary
Despite being mandated to host the College of Agriculture of the Mountain Province State Polytechnic College in the northern Barangay Bacarri, the campus is still unrealized due to funding difficulties from the national government. The Paracelis campus of the Mountain Province State Polytechnic College was made through the conversion of Bacarri Agricultural High School, a rural high school in Barangay Bacarri.

Secondary education
8 out of 9 Barangays in Paracelis have their respective secondary institution. Annex campus of major high schools in different Barangays were converted into a regular and independent high schools. The list of secondary schools are as follows:
Bacarri National Trade and Agricultural School - Barangay Bacarri
Paracelis Technical and Vocational High School - Sitio Labay, Barangay Bantay
Anonat National Agricultural and Vocation High School( Formerly Bacarri National Trade and Agricultural School- Anonat Annex) - Barangay Anonat
Buringal National High School - Barangay Buringal
Butigue National High School - Barangay Butigue
Palitod National High School - Barangay Palitod
San Rafael National High School - Sitio San Rafael, Barangay Bananao
Paracelis National High School - Barangay Poblacion
9.Bacarri National Trade and Agricultural School - Bunot Extension - Barangay Bunot

Health
A district hospital serves the people of Paracelis. Recently, the municipal mayor, Avelino C. Amangyen signed a memorandum of agreement at the Japan Embassy in Manila with Japan International Cooperation Agency, JICA representatives for the construction of the rural health unit building.

References

External links

 [ Philippine Standard Geographic Code]
Philippine Census Information

Municipalities of Mountain Province